Scratchy may refer to:

Scratchy, a cartoon cat on The Itchy & Scratchy Show, a show within The Simpsons
Scratchy: The Complete Reprise Recordings, an album by Crazy Horse
Scratchy & Co., a British children's television series
Scratchy Bottom, a valley in England
Scratchy (MC), member of the British grime group Roll Deep

See also
Scratch (disambiguation)